Estral Beach is a village in Monroe County in the U.S. state of Michigan. The population was 403 at the 2020 census.  The village is located within Berlin Charter Township.

History
Estral Beach was incorporated as a village in 1925.  It was named after the Spanish word for star.

Geography

Estral Beach is located on the shores of Lake Erie at the mouth of Swan Creek.  Pointe Mouillee State Game Area is located just to the northeast, and Enrico Fermi Nuclear Generating Station is just to the south.  The Strong Unit of the Detroit River International Wildlife Refuge is located within the northern portion of the village and extends further north.

The village has never contained its own post office and uses the Newport 48166 ZIP Code.

Education
The village is served by Jefferson Schools.

Demographics

2010 census
As of the census of 2010, there were 418 people, 183 households, and 114 families residing in the village. The racial makeup of the village was 99.3% White and 0.7% Native American. Hispanic or Latino of any race were 1.0% of the population.

There were 183 households, of which 28.4% had children under the age of 18 living with them, 51.9% were married couples living together, 6.6% had a female householder with no husband present, 3.8% had a male householder with no wife present, and 37.7% were non-families. 33.3% of all households were made up of individuals, and 8.8% had someone living alone who was 65 years of age or older. The average household size was 2.28 and the average family size was 2.95.

The median age in the village was 45 years. 19.9% of residents were under the age of 18; 7.1% were between the ages of 18 and 24; 22.9% were from 25 to 44; 36.4% were from 45 to 64; and 13.6% were 65 years of age or older. The gender makeup of the village was 53.3% male and 46.7% female.

2000 census
As of the census of 2000, there were 486 people, 179 households, and 131 families residing in the village. The racial makeup of the village was 93.00% White, 1.23% African American, 0.21% Native American, 0.41% from other races, and 5.14% from two or more races. Hispanic or Latino of any race were 2.67% of the population.

There were 179 households, out of which 31.8% had children under the age of 18 living with them, 59.8% were married couples living together, 7.8% had a female householder with no husband present, and 26.8% were non-families. 20.7% of all households were made up of individuals, and 7.3% had someone living alone who was 65 years of age or older.  The average household size was 2.69 and the average family size was 3.15.

In the village, the population was spread out, with 25.1% under the age of 18, 7.6% from 18 to 24, 30.0% from 25 to 44, 27.8% from 45 to 64, and 9.5% who were 65 years of age or older.  The median age was 37 years. For every 100 females, there were 101.7 males.  For every 100 females age 18 and over, there were 102.2 males.

The median income for a household in the village was $48,194, and the median income for a family was $53,750. Males had a median income of $32,188 versus $30,417 for females. The per capita income for the village was $21,873.  About 3.6% of families and 7.2% of the population were below the poverty line, including 6.7% of those under age 18 and 5.5% of those age 65 or over.

References

Villages in Monroe County, Michigan
Villages in Michigan
Michigan populated places on Lake Erie
1925 establishments in Michigan
Populated places established in 1925